Ch'iyar Jaqhi (Aymara ch'iyara black, jaqhi precipice, cliff, "black cliff", also spelled Chiar Jakke) is a  mountain in the Andes of Bolivia. It lies in the Oruro Department, Sajama Province, Turco Municipality. Ch'iyar Jaqhi lies southwest of Kuntur Ikiña and east of Umurata.

References 

Mountains of Oruro Department